Road to Saint Ives is a solo album by the English saxophonist John Surman, recorded in 1990 and released on the ECM label.

Reception 
The AllMusic review by Stacia Proefrock called the album "a gentle, introspective, yet adventurous solo work... The entire album is a one-man effort, from the composition to all of the instrumentation, with Surman building strata of sound over keyboard and percussion structures using bass clarinet and the soprano and bass saxophones he is known for. The resulting work communicates a unique vision and mood, unsullied by the conflicting interpretations of other performers".

Track listing 
All compositions by John Surman.

 "Polperro" – 2:06
 "Tintagel" – 12:10
 "Trethevy Quoit" – 0:53
 "Rame Head" – 4:39
 "Mevagissey" – 6:50
 "Lostwithiel" – 1:25
 "Perranporth" – 1:58
 "Bodmin Moor" – 6:40
 "Kelly Bray" – 1:22
 "Piperspool" – 5:08
 "Marazion" – 2:35
 "Bedruthan Steps" – 7:28

Personnel 
John Surman – soprano saxophone, baritone saxophone, bass clarinet, keyboards, percussion

References 

ECM Records albums
John Surman albums
1990 albums
Albums produced by Manfred Eicher